Tanel Rander (born 1 December 1980) is an Estonian artist, curator and writer.

In 2005, he graduated from the University of Tartu, studying law. In 2010, he graduated from the Estonian Academy of Arts, studying interdisciplinary art.

Works
 2008: novel  ("Out of Control") 
 2012:

Exhibitions
 2010:  (Tallinn City Gallery) 
 2010:  (Y-Gallery, Tartu)

References

Living people
1980 births
Estonian male novelists
Estonian male short story writers
21st-century Estonian male artists
21st-century Estonian writers
Estonian Academy of Arts alumni
University of Tartu alumni